LaLiga Tech is the subsidiary that brings together all of the technological solutions of LaLiga. Created in 2021, it supplies digital tools to the global sports and entertainment industry.

Development 
When Javier Tebas assumed the presidency of the Liga Nacional de Fútbol Profesional in 2013, one of the strategic avenues was integrated technological development. Given that there were no suppliers in the market capable of comprehensively meeting LaLiga's needs, Spanish football's organising body decided to bring in the technical engineering and data talent it required. These solutions have been developed by a team of 150 specialists and are the result of the experience amassed by LaLiga since 2014.

Based on artificial intelligence data and through the digitalisation of processes, a digital ecosystem has been developed that operates in an integrated, modular and scalable manner. The range of technology tools created have been applied at stadiums, by the clubs and fans, and by a range of broadcast channels, and are applicable to any sports competition, not just to football. These solutions simplify and accelerate digital fan relationships, competition management and content improvement, by establishing multiple channels for interaction between the different participants in the games.

LaLiga Tech was unveiled in September 2021 with Miguel Ángel Leal as its CEO. It has Microsoft as its technology and innovation partner, as well as being the supplier of Microsoft Azure, the Microsoft cloud.

Dorna Sports, the Jupiler Pro League, Sky México and the Royal Belgian Football Association are among the users of LaLiga Tech's tools and solutions. A number of agreements have also been struck with the World Padel Tour and Millicom.

In 2022, LaLiga Tech and Centro Español de Derechos Reprográficos (CEDRO) signed an agreement to prosecute worldwide the illegal use of protected material on websites, social networks, online videos, etc. This agreement is developed through the use of a tool, "LaLiga Content Protection" by CEDRO. "LaLiga Content Protection" team is formed by analysts and consultants distributed in two hubs in Mexico and Spain.

Range of technology tools

Fan management and interaction 

 OTT (internet TV platform): a multi-device application that provides audiovisual content in various formats.
 Apps/Websites for "Fantasy" competition and gamification to follow the competition and play in it/with it.
 Smart Venues: Capacity management software.
 Fan activation through customised itineraries that integrate the entire digital fan experience.

Content improvement 

 Mediacoach: match analysis and visualisation tool (with images provided by perimeter cameras that follow each player), provides advanced technical and tactical statistics on sporting performance, allowing content to be improved along two lines:
 For broadcasters and fans, by providing analysis and data in the different stages of the match (pre-, in- and post-match).
 For clubs/coaches, by allowing them to make technical and tactical decisions with an analysis layer.
 Content Protection: Protection of content to prevent piracy and a decline in audiovisual quality, as well as protecting brands against potential counterfeiting.
 Content integrity through betting control, monitoring and analysis, allowing potential manipulation of the competition to be pre-empted and analysed.

Competition management   
Solutions for optimising management of the competition and allowing its return, for example:

 Kit selector: digitises the process of selecting kits in the competition.
 Calendar selector: allows for the optimisation of kick-off times, taking into account a range of factors, such as stadium attendance, audiences, weather, etc.

References

External links 

 Web Site

Internet technology companies of Spain